"Cocoon" is the seventh single of singer Anna Tsuchiya. The single was released by Mad Pray Records on 30 January 2008 in two versions; as a regular CD and a limited edition CD+DVD version. The song spent four weeks in the Oricon charts, reaching #19 on 11 February 2008. "cocoon" was used in a NTT DoCoMo television commercial, while the B-side "U" was used as the campaign song for the DVD release of The L Word in Japan. The third track, "Guys", was not included in the limited edition version.

Track listing

References

2008 singles
Anna Tsuchiya songs
2008 songs